Paul Creston (born Giuseppe Guttoveggio; October 10, 1906 – August 24, 1985) was an Italian American composer of classical music.

Biography
Born in New York City to Sicilian immigrants, Creston was self-taught as a composer.  His work tends to be fairly conservative in style, with a strong rhythmic element. His pieces include six symphonies; a number of concertos, including two for violin, one for marimba and orchestra (premiered by Ruth Stuber), one each for one piano,   two pianos, and accordion, and a concerto for alto saxophone (the latter dedicated to Cecil Leeson); as well as a fantasia for trombone and orchestra (composed for and premiered by Robert Marsteller). Also for alto saxophone Creston wrote a Rapsodie for Jean-Marie Londeix; a suite (1935) and a sonata (Op. 19, 1939), both dedicated to Cecil Leeson (the sonata was arranged by Marco Ciccone for saxophone and orchestra in 2008); and also a suite for organ, Op. 70.

Several of his works were inspired by the poetry of Walt Whitman.

He died in Poway, California, a suburb of San Diego.

[according to verifiable facts, concert programs.Slomsky, Bio-Bibliography. see attached]          ]    Creston was one of the most performed American composers of the 1940s and 1950s.  Several of his works have become staples of the wind band repertoire. Zanoni, Prelude and Dance and the Celebration Overture have been and still are on several state lists for contests across the USA.

Creston was also a notable teacher, whose students included the composers Irwin Swack, John Corigliano, Alvin Singleton, Elliott Schwartz, Frank Felice, Charles Roland Berry; accordionist/composer William Schimmel; and the jazz musicians Rusty Dedrick and Charlie Queener. List of music students by teacher: C to F §Paul Creston He wrote the theoretical books Principles of Rhythm (1964) and Rational Metric Notation (1979).  He taught at Central Washington State College from 1968 to 1975.

Selected works

Stage
 Two Choric Dances – "Time Out of Mind", Ballet, Op. 17a (1938)
 A Tale About the Land, An American Folk Ballet for voice, piano, clarinet and percussion, Op. 23 (1940)

Orchestral
 Out of the Cradle Endlessly Rocking (1934); after a poem by Walt Whitman
 Gregorian Chant for string orchestra; arrangement of movement III from String Quartet, Op. 8
 Fugue for string orchestra; arrangement of movement IV from String Quartet, Op. 8
 Threnody, Op. 16 (1938)
 Two Choric Dances, Op. 17 (1938); for chamber orchestra (Op. 17a) or orchestra (Op. 17b)
 Symphony No. 1, Op. 20 (1940)
 Prelude and Dance, Op. 25 (1941)
 A Rumor, Op. 27 (1941)
 Pastorale and Tarantella, Op. 28 (1941)
 Chant of 1942, Op. 33 (1943)
 Frontiers, Op. 34 (1943)
 Symphony No. 2, Op. 35 (1944)
 Poem, Op. 39 (1945)
 Homage for string orchestra, Op. 41 (1947)
 Symphony No. 3 "Three Mysteries", Op. 48 (1950)
 Symphony No. 4, Op. 52 (1951)
 Walt Whitman, Op. 53 (1952)
 Invocation and Dance, Op. 58 (1953)
 Dance Overture, Op. 62 (1954)
 Symphony No. 5, Op. 64 (1955)
 Lydian Ode, Op. 67
 Toccata, Op. 68 (1957)
 Pre-Classic Suite, Op. 71 (1957)
 Janus, Op. 77 (1959)
 Corinthians XIII, Tone Poem, Op. 82 (1963)
 Choreografic Suite, Op. 86 (1965); for chamber orchestra (Op. 86a) or orchestra (Op. 86b)
 Introit "Hommage à Pierre Monteux", Op. 87 (1965–1966)
 Airborne Suite (1966)
Evening in Texas
Sunrise in Puerto Rico
High Noon – Montreal
Midnight – Mexico
 Pavanne Variations, Op. 89 (1966)
 Chthonic Ode "Homage to Henry Moore" for large orchestra with euphonium, celesta and piano, Op. 90 (1966)
 Thanatopsis, Op. 101 (1971)
 Suite for string orchestra, Op. 109 (1978)
 Symphony No. 6 "Organ Symphony" for organ and orchestra, Op. 118 (1981)
 Evening in Texas
 Kangaroo Kaper
 Rumba - Tarantella
 Sunrise in Puerto Rico

Concert band
 Legend, Op. 31 (1942)
 Zanoni, Op. 40 (1946)
 Celebration Overture, Op. 61 (1954)
 Prelude and Dance, Op. 76 (1959)
 Anatolia (Turkish Rhapsody), Op. 93 (1967)
 Kalevala, Fantasy on Finnish Folk Songs, Op. 95 (1968)
 Jubilee, Op. 102 (1971)
 Liberty Song '76, Op. 107 (1975); also for mixed chorus and concert band
 Festive Overture, Op. 116 (1980)

Concertante
 Concertino for Marimba and Orchestra (or concert band), Op. 21 (1940) (premiered by Ruth Stuber)
 Concerto for saxophone and orchestra, Op. 26 (1941)
 Concerto for alto saxophone, Op. 26 (1944)
 Fantasy for piano and orchestra, Op. 32 (1942)
 Dawn Mood for piano and orchestra, Op. 36 (1944)
 Poem for harp and orchestra, Op. 39 (1945)
 Fantasy for trombone and orchestra (or concert band), Op. 42 (1947)
 Concerto for piano and orchestra, Op. 43 (1949)
 Concerto for 2 pianos and orchestra, Op. 50 (1950)
 Concerto No. 1 for violin and orchestra, Op. 65 (1956)
 Concerto for accordion and orchestra, Op. 75
 Concerto No. 2 for violin and orchestra, Op. 78 (1960)
 Fantasy for accordion and orchestra, Op. 85 (1964); also for accordion solo
 Sādhanā for cello and orchestra, Op. 117 (1981)

Chamber music
 Three Poems from Walt Whitman for cello and piano, Op. 4
 Suite for alto saxophone or clarinet and piano, Op. 6 (1935)
 String Quartet, Op. 8 (1936)
 Partita for flute, violin (or 2 violins) and piano (or string orchestra), Op. 12 (1937)
 Suite for viola and piano, Op. 13 (1938)
 Suite for violin and piano, Op. 18
 Sonata for alto saxophone and piano, Op. 19 (1939)
 Meditation for marimba and organ (arrangement of movement  II of Concertino, Op. 21)
 Homage for viola (or cello), harp and organ, Op. 41 (1947); also for string orchestra
 Lydian Song for harp solo, Op. 55 (1952)
 Suite for flute, viola and piano, Op. 56 (1953)
 Suite for cello and piano, Op. 66 (1956)
 Olympia, Rhapsody for harp solo, Op. 94 (1968)
 Concertino for piano and woodwind quintet, Op. 99 (1969)
 Ceremonial for percussion ensemble and piano, Op. 103 (1972)
 Rapsodie for saxophone and organ, Op. 108 (1976)
 Suite for saxophone quartet, Op. 111 (1979)
 Piano Trio, Op. 112 (1979)
 Cantilena from Sadhana for cello and piano, Op. 117 (1981); original for cello and orchestra; also for voice and piano
 Fanfare for Paratroopers for brass

Keyboard
 Hippo's Dance for piano
 Kangaroo Kaper for piano
 Little Red Pony for piano
 Moment Musical for piano (1926)
 Phases: Dance Suite for piano
 Prelude and Dance for piano
 Antitheses for piano (1930)
 A Chant of Work for piano (1930)
 Five Dances for piano, Op. 1
 Music for "Iron Flowers" for piano (1933?); incidental music for the play by Cecil Lewis
 Seven Theses for piano, Op. 3 (1933)
 Variations on "The First Noel" for organ (1934)
 Sonata for piano, Op. 9
 Five Two-Part Inventions for piano, Op. 14 (1946)
 Five Little Dances for piano, Op. 24
 Prelude and Dance for piano, Op. 29
 Six Preludes for piano, Op. 38
 Prelude and Dance for accordion, Op. 69 (1957)
 Suite for organ, Op. 70
 Fantasia for organ, Op. 74 (1958)
 Wedding Recessional for organ (1961)
 Three Narratives for piano, Op. 79 (1962)
 Pony Rondo (a.k.a. Rondino) for piano solo (1964)
 Rapsodia Breve for organ, Op. 81 (1963)
 Metamorphoses for piano, Op. 84 (1964)
 Fantasy for accordion solo, Op. 85 (1964); also for accordion and orchestra
 Rumba-Tarantella for piano 4-hands (1964)
 Song of Sicily for piano (1964); from the TV film The Twentieth Century: Invasion of Sicily
 Rhythmicon, Piano Studies in Rhythm, 10 Books (1964–1977)
 Interlude for piano (c.1966)
 Embryo Suite for accordion solo, Op. 96 (1968)
 Variation for Eugene Ormandy (On the Occasion of His 70th Birthday) for piano (1969)
 Romanza for piano, Op. 110 (1978)
 Offertory for piano, Op. 113 (1980)
 Interlude for piano, Op. 114 (1980)
 Prelude and Dance for 2 pianos, Op. 120 (1982)

Vocal
 Seems Lak de Love Dreams Just Wont Last for voice and piano (c.1923); words by Marguerite T. George
 "I Am He Who Walks the States..." for voice and piano
 The Bird of the Wilderness for voice and piano, Op. 2
 Thanatopses, 4 Songs to Death for voice and piano (or voice, piano and string quartet), Op. 7 (1935); words by Rabindranath Tagore
 Three Sonnets for voice and piano, Op. 10 (1936); words by Arthur Davison Ficke
 Dance Variations for coloratura soprano and orchestra, Op. 30 (1941–1942)
 Psalm XXIII for high voice and piano, Op. 37 (1945); original for soprano, mixed chorus and orchestra
 Three Songs for voice and piano, Op. 46 (1950); words by Edward Pinkney and John Neihardt
 The Lambs to the Lamb for voice and piano, Op. 47 (1950); original version for female chorus and piano or organ; words by Martha Nicholson Kemp
 French Canadian Folk Songs for voice and piano, Op. 49 (1950)
 Ave Maria for voice and piano, Op. 57 (1953)
 La Lettre for voice and piano, Op. 59 (1954)
 A Song of Joys for voice and piano, Op. 63 (1955); words by Walt Whitman
 Song of Sicily for voice and piano (1964); from the TV score Invasion of Sicily
 Nocturne for soprano or tenor and 11 instruments, Op. 83 (1964); words by W. H. Auden
 Palermo in the Moonlight for voice and piano (1964); words by Mitchell Parish
 From The Psalmist for contralto and orchestra, Op. 91 (1967)
 Cantilena from Sadhana for voice and piano, Op. 117 (1981); original for cello and orchestra; also for cello and piano
 Carousel Song for voice and piano; words by Arthur Newman

Choral
 Three Chorales from Tagore for mixed chorus a cappella, Op. 11; words by Rabindranath Tagore
 Missa Pro Defunctis ("Requiem Mass") for male chorus and organ, Op. 15 (1938)
 Dedication for mixed chorus and piano (or organ, or string orchestra), Op. 22 (1940); originally entitled Dirge; words by Arturo Giovannitti
 Here Is Thy Footstool for mixed chorus a cappella
 Psalm XXIII for soprano, mixed chorus and orchestra, Op. 37 (1945); also for voice and piano; also a version for male chorus and piano
 Missa Solemnis for mixed chorus or male chorus and organ or orchestra, Op. 44
 Two Motets for male chorus and organ, Op. 45 (1950)
 The Lambs to the Lamb for female chorus and piano or organ, Op. 47 (1950); also a version for voice and piano; words by Martha Nicholson Kemp
 Black and Tan America for baritone, mixed chorus and piano, Op. 51 (1951); words by Charles H. Stern
 Missa "Adoro Te" for mixed chorus and organ, Op. 54 (1952)
 Cindy for mixed chorus and piano (1953)
 Prayer of Thanksgiving for mixed chorus and organ (1953)
 Way Up on Old Smoky for mixed chorus and organ (1953)
 The Celestial Vision for male chorus a cappella, Op. 60 (1954); words by Dante, Walt Whitman, and from the Bhagavad Gita
 My Lord Upon a Sickle Hangs for mixed chorus (1955?); words by Louis J. Maloof
 Praise the Lord for mixed chorus a cappella, Op. 72
 Lilium Regis for mixed chorus and piano, Op. 73 (1958); words by Francis Thompson
 Isaiah's Prophecy, A Christmas Oratorio for soprano, mezzo-soprano, 2 tenors, 2 baritones, bass, mixed chorus and orchestra, Op. 80 (1962)
 Mass of the Angels for unison voices (1966)
 Now Thank We All Our God for mixed chorus and organ, Op. 88 (1966)
 None Lives For Ever for female chorus and piano or organ, Op. 92 (1967); words by Rabindranath Tagore
 Missa "Cum Jubilo" for mixed chorus a cappella (or with piano, organ, or string orchestra), Op. 97 (1968)
 Hyas Illahee: A Corosymfonic Suite (The Northwest Corosymfonic Suite) for mixed chorus and piano, Op. 98 (1969)
 Leaves of Grass for mixed chorus and piano, Op. 100 (1970); words by Walt Whitman
 Calamus for baritone, mixed chorus, brass ensemble, timpani and percussion, Op. 104 (1972); words by Walt Whitman
 Liberty Song '76 for mixed chorus and concert band, Op. 107 (1975); also for band
 Prodigal for mixed chorus and piano, Op. 115 (1980); words by Renato M. Getti
 O Come, Let Us Sing for mixed chorus and organ, Op. 119 (1982); text adapted from Psalms 92, 95, and 96

TV and film scores
 Lake Carrier (1942)
 Brought to Action (1945)
 Air Power, TV series (1956)
 The Twentieth Century, TV series (7 episodes, 1958–1964)
 The Russo-Finnish War (November 16, 1958)
 Revolt in Hungary (December 14, 1958); Creston received a Christopher Award.
 The Frozen War (February 8, 1959)
 Suicide Run to Murmansk (November 1, 1959)
 Typhoon at Okinawa (November 26, 1961)
 The Great Weather Mystery (December 24, 1961)
 Invasion of Sicily (January 19, 1964)
 In the American Grain, documentary on poet William Carlos Williams; Creston won an Emmy Award for his score.

Incomplete works
 Pantonal Lullaby, Op. 121

Literary works
 Principles of Rhythm, F. Colombo, New York (1964)
 The Beat Goes On (1969)
 Creative Harmony, New York (1970)
 Music and Mass Media (1970)
 A Composer's Creed (1971)
 Rational Metric Notation, Exposition Press, New York (1979)

Bibliography

Simmons, Walter. Voices in the Wilderness: Six American Neo-Romantic Composers. (Lanham, MD: Scarecrow Press, 2006) . .

References

Paul Creston. Premieres and Performances. 1941 to 1951

External links
Creston collection at UMKC's Miller Nichols Library
Schirmer worklist

1906 births
1985 deaths
20th-century American composers
20th-century American male musicians
20th-century classical composers
American classical composers
American male classical composers
Ballet composers
Classical musicians from New York (state)
Musicians from New York City